William Wirt Vaughan (July 2, 1831 – August 19, 1878) was an American politician and a member of the United States House of Representatives for the 8th congressional district of Tennessee.

Biography
Vaughan was born on July 2, 1831 in LaGuardo (now Martha), Tennessee in Wilson County. He attended the common schools and graduated from Cumberland University in Lebanon, Tennessee. He studied law, was admitted to the bar in 1860, and commenced practice in Brownsville, Tennessee.

Elected as a Democrat to the Forty-second Congress, Vaughan served from March 4, 1871 to March 3, 1873,  but was not a successful candidate for re-election in 1872 to the Forty-third Congress. He resumed the practice of law in Brownsville and became one of the prime movers in the building of the Chesapeake & Ohio Railroad branch from Brownsville to Newbern. He was president of the system at the time of his death. He became a candidate for election in 1878 to the Forty-sixth Congress.

Death
On August 19, 1878 Vaughan died, at age 47 years, 48 days, in Crockett Mills near Alamo, Tennessee in Crockett County while canvassing the district. He is interred at Oakwood Cemetery in Brownsville, Tennessee.

References

External links

1831 births
1878 deaths
Democratic Party members of the United States House of Representatives from Tennessee
19th-century American politicians
People from Wilson County, Tennessee